The Thuwunna Youth Training Center Stadium, simply known as the Thuwunna Stadium, is a multi-purpose stadium located in Yangon, Myanmar. It is the venue of choice for most national and international football and track and field competitions.

This 32,000-seat stadium is smaller but more up-to-date than the Bogyoke Aung San Stadium. It is part of a complex that also includes the Thuwunna National Indoor Stadium.

The stadium's eight-lane running track is the first in Myanmar that conforms to IAAF standards.

History

Constructed with help from the Japanese government, the stadium was completed in 1985.

From 23 June to 3 July 2012, the stadium hosted 2013 AFC U-22 Asian Cup qualification Group G matches.

The stadium underwent a major renovation and was expanded to host football matches of the 2013 Southeast Asian Games. It also hosted the qualification stage of the 2012 AFF Championship and matches in Group B of the main tournament in 2016.

References

External links

Football venues in Myanmar
Buildings and structures in Yangon
Sports venues completed in 1985
Sport in Yangon
1985 establishments in Burma